The Beaver Valley Nitehawks are a junior 'B' ice hockey team based in Fruitvale, British Columbia, Canada. They are members of the Neil Murdoch Division of the Kootenay Conference of the Kootenay International Junior Hockey League (KIJHL). The Nitehawks play their home games at Beaver Valley Arena. Stephen Piccolo is the team's president and Terry Jones is the general manager and coach since 2015.  They are currently co-captained by forward Morgan Peace and Angus Amadio who were awarded a bursary in 2020. 

The Nitehawks joined the league in 1981 as an expansion team. In its KIJHL history the team has won the Keystone Cup once in 2014; the Cyclone Taylor Cup four times, in 1997, 2001, 2014 & 2017; and have won the KIJHL Championship eight times, in 1997, 1999, 2001, 2003, 2004, 2012, 2014 and 2017. They won nine division playoff titles as a member of the Neil Murdoch Division from 1996-2014; one conference playoff title as a member of the Kootenay Conference from 2007 to 2014.

The Nitehawks have retired four players' jerseys in their team history—Rocky Dickson (2), Barrett Jackman (6),  Adam Deadmarsh (12) and Sam Swanson (29).

Team history

1979-1981: KIJHL application
The idea of starting a junior hockey team in Fruitvale was born when Shirley Levesque, manager of the Beaver Valley Midgets, and Darrell Dickson, their coach, hosted a Beaver Valley Minor Hockey Tournament. During this tournament they noticed people from the valley, who had never before been inside the 10-year-old building, coming to games at six in the morning to watch the young talent. This was a good indication that there were many local hockey fans just waiting for some exciting and entertaining hockey; Darrell suggested to Shirley that they start a junior team, and the work began.

First they had to convince the Kootenay International Junior Hockey League that there were enough young hockey players in the area to man another junior team. This was not an easy task, as many KIJHL teams at the time were situated within a half-hour of Fruitvale, and a new team might cause them to lose players they had counted on—but on the other hand it was also appealing to them: they knew that great rivalries would begin, bringing new fans to their arenas. Since BVMH was one of the strongest minor hockey programs around at the time, it seemed fitting they should have their own junior team to go with it.

Once the KIJHL accepted, an executive was formed consisting of Darrell Dickson, Shirley Levesque, Roy Taylor, Noel Smith and Stuart McPhee. There was a contest to choose the name, and when Robbie Taylor of Fruitvale suggested Nitehawks the executive knew they had a winner. Kim Campbell of Trail designed the hawk for the jersey crest, the first coaches were Tom Gawryletz and Murry Price, Darrell Dickson was the manager, and the trainers were Barry Marshall and Leo Campeau.

1981–82
The 1981-82 KIJHL season saw the first Beaver Valley Nitehawks hit the ice, led by captain Tyler Bolduc. The first year was very successful: the team went into a wild playoff with the Trail Smoke Eaters, and additional bleachers had to be brought into the arena for these exciting games. The Nitehawks were up two games to none, but when Trail came back to win the series they set the tempo of rivalry for years to come.

1982-present
Over the next three decades the Nitehawks won their division championship nine times, the KIJHL championship five times (in 1997, 1999, 2001, 2003, 2004 and 2012), and two provincial championships for the Cyclone Taylor Cup (in 1997 and 2001). When they won the Cup in 2001, their playoff win–loss record was a perfect 16-0.

Entering the 2013-14 KIJHL Playoffs, the Nitehawks have made nineteen consecutive playoff appearances since the 1995-96 season; winning six-out-of-nine KIJHL Championships and winning one-out-of-four Cyclone Taylor Cups in that span.

They set a record in junior hockey for the longest winning streak, which started in the 1997 season and ended in the 1998 season after 39 straight wins. Many players receive scholarships and continue on to play college hockey but, of course, the pride of Fruitvale and the Nitehawks is Adam Deadmarsh, who not only won the World Cup of Hockey with Team USA but also brought the coveted Stanley Cup home to the Beaver Valley Arena in 1996. Other players drafted by the NHL teams were Ed Cristofoli from the 1983 team, Neil Eisenhut from the 1985 team, and Barrett Jackman from the 1997 team.

Season-by-season record

Note: GP = Games played, W = Wins, L = Losses, T = Ties, D = Defaults, OTL = Overtime Losses, Pts = Points, GF = Goals for, GA = Goals against

Final records as of February 18, 2018.

Playoffs

Cyclone Taylor Cup

Keystone Cup history
Western Canadian Jr. B Championships (Northern Ontario to British Columbia)Six teams in round robin play. 1st vs 2nd for gold/silver; 3rd vs 4th for bronze.

NHL alumni

Awards and trophies

Cyclone Taylor Cup (4)
1997, 2001, 2014, 2017

Keystone Cup (1)
2014

KIJHL Championship (8)
1996-97, 1998–99, 2000–01, 2002–03, 2003–04, 2011–12, 2013–14, 2016-17

Coach of the Year
Terry Jones: 2002-03, 2004–05, 2005-06 (Divisional)
Terry Jones: 2011-12 (Divisional and League)

Most Sportsmanlike
Tyler Waycott: 2003-04 (Divisional)
Kyle St. Denis: 2005-06 (Divisional)
Ryon Sookro: 2010-11 (Divisional and League)
Chris DerochieL 2011-12 (Divisional)
Ryan Edwards 2013-14 (Divisional and League)
Michael Pruss: 2014-2015 (Divisional)

Most Valuable Player
Jake Morissette: 2001-02 (Divisional)
Kevin Koopman: 2005-06 (Divisional)
Craig Martin: 2011-12 (Divisional)
Dallas Calvin: 2012-13 (Divisional)
Mitch Foyle: 2014-2015 (Divisional)

Rookie of the Year
Conner Jones: 2006-07 (Divisional)
Kellen Jones: 2006-07 (Divisional)
Steve Koshey: 2007-08 (Divisional)
Dallas Calvin: 2010-11(Divisional)
Craig Martin: 2011-12 (Divisional)
Connor Brown-Maloski: 2012-13 (Divisional)
Ross Armour: 2014-2015 (Divisional)

Top Goaltender
Louis Menard: 2002-03 (Divisional)
Ryan Riddle: 2003-04 (Divisional)
Michael Persson: 2004-05 (Divisional)
Justin Mulholland: 2005-06 (Divisional)
Patrick Sullivan: 2006-2007 (Divisional)
Hunter Young: 2019-20 (Divisional and Leaque) 
Top Scorer
Jake Morissette: 2001-02 (Divisional)
Scott Morisseau: 2009-10 (Divisional and League)
Chris Derochie: 2011-12 (Divisional)
More about their team records can be found on their website.

References

External links
Official website of the Beaver Valley Nitehawks

Ice hockey teams in British Columbia
1981 establishments in British Columbia
Ice hockey clubs established in 1981